Herman Benjamin Baruch (April 28, 1872 – March 15, 1953) was an American physician and diplomat who served as United States Ambassador to the Netherlands and Portugal.

Life and career

Herman Benjamin Baruch was born in Camden, South Carolina on April 28, 1872.  The son of Simon Baruch and brother of Bernard Baruch, he graduated from the College of the City of New York in 1892, attended the University of Virginia, and received his medical degree from the Columbia University College of Physicians and Surgeons in 1895.

Baruch practiced medicine in New York City, and later became a partner with his brothers Bernard, Hartwig and Sailing in Baruch Brothers, an investment bank and stock brokerage.  The Baruchs were supporters of the Democratic party, with Bernard advising both Woodrow Wilson and Franklin D. Roosevelt during their presidencies, and all the brothers and their company providing financial support to the party and its candidates.

Baruch was a Delegate to the 1932 Democratic National Convention, and was also a presidential elector, casting his ballot for Franklin D. Roosevelt.  In 1943 Baruch was appointed representative of the U.S. Board of Economic Warfare in Brazil and special advisor to the U.S. Ambassador in that country.

In 1945 Baruch was appointed United States Ambassador to Portugal.  He served until 1947, when he was named United States Ambassador to the Netherlands.  Baruch served at The Hague until 1949, when he resigned as part of his brother Bernard's dispute with President Harry S. Truman.  On his list of appointments for September 5, 1945 Truman described his 11:15 AM meeting with Herman Baruch: "Flatterer.  Wants to be ambassador to France.  Conniver like his Brother."

After returning to the United States, Baruch became President of the Simon Baruch Foundation.  He was a Delegate to the 1952 Democratic National Convention.

Baruch died in Wyandanch, New York on March 15, 1953.  He is buried in Flushing Cemetery, Queens, New York.

References

External links
Herman Benjamin Baruch record of service, Office of the Historian, United States Department of State

1872 births
1953 deaths
People from Camden, South Carolina
People from Wyandanch, New York
New York (state) Democrats
City College of New York alumni
Columbia University Vagelos College of Physicians and Surgeons alumni
American people of World War II
American people of German-Jewish descent
Ambassadors of the United States to Portugal
Ambassadors of the United States to the Netherlands
Burials at Flushing Cemetery
Articles containing video clips